The 7th South African Grand Prix was a motor race, run to Formula Libre rules, held on 27 December in East London. The race was run over 80 laps of the circuit, and was dominated by British driver Stirling Moss who took pole and came home in first place. Jo Bonnier finished second and also set the fastest lap of the race. The 1960 Formula One World Champion Jack Brabham finished third.

The race was the second South African Grand Prix to be held in 1960, with the 6th South African Grand Prix having been held on 1 January 1960.

Results

References

Grand Prix, 1960
1960
South African Grand Prix
South African Grand Prix